Exeter Book Riddle 7 (according to the numbering of the Anglo-Saxon Poetic Records) is one of the Old English riddles found in the later tenth-century Exeter Book, in this case on folio 103r. The solution is believed to be 'swan' and the riddle is noted as being one of the Old English riddles whose solution is most widely agreed on. The riddle can be understood in its manuscript context as part of a sequence of bird-riddles.

Text

As edited by Richard Marsden, and translated by Elaine Treharne, Riddle 7 runs:

Editions and translations
 Jessica Lockhart, translation and commentary for Riddle 7, The Riddle Ages: Early Medieval Riddles, Translations and Commentaries, ed. by Megan Cavell, with Matthias Ammon, Neville Mogford and Victoria Symons (Birmingham: University of Birmingham, 2020 [first publ. 2013])
 Foys, Martin et al. (eds.) Old English Poetry in Facsimile Project, (Madison, WI: Center for the History of Print and Digital Culture, 2019-). Online edition annotated and linked to digital facsimile, with a modern translation.

Recordings

 Michael D. C. Drout, 'Riddle 7', performed from the Anglo-Saxon Poetic Records edition (19 October 2007).

References

Riddles
Old English literature
Old English poetry
Poems about birds